Espiritu Joven is a Catholic youth movement in Cuba, focused on foreign Catholic medical students. Espiritu Joven was origined by a Catholic monk, Sr. Cristina S.M and three medical students in ELAM (Escuela Latino Americana de Medicina), in Havana, Cuba, in 1999. Now, after 13 years, with seven branches and more than 300 participants, the movement is enrolling throughout Cuba.

History
The Espiritu Joven, has started with its home school, ELAM, on 27 October 1999, the Feast of St. Jude. When in 1999, the ELAM has started, catholic students from Latin American countries faced problems in gathering and doing their prayer activities in week days, other than Sunday masses, to solve these problems with the Colombian origin catholic nun Sr. Cristina and Several Catholic students from Latin America have started the movement in the day of St.Jude in October 28, 1999. From that day up to now the Espiritu Joven is doing its weekly activities in ELAM.

Presence outside the ELAM
The Espiritu Joven has started its presence outside of the ELAM in 2001, when the first badge students went to provinces with the process of decentralization. From 2001, Espiritu Joven is having its branches all over Cuba. Cuban provinces such as, Pinar del Rio, Villa Clara, Camagüey, Santiago de Cuba and Las Tunas are having branches other than the capital, Havana. In Havana, medical faculties, other than ELAM, Salvador Allende, Julio Trigo, Miguel Enríquez and Vitoria de Giron are having their branches.

Coordination
The Coordination and spiritual direction of Espiritu Joven, depends on the branch. All branches have their own coordination and the spiritual direction. In ELAM, the Home Branch, Sr. Maria Cristina Palacio S.M., the founder of Espiritu Joven, acting as a spiritual guide from 1999 with Sr. Gabriela Ines from 2012. In the ELAM, the coordination is having by an eight members committee, which changes every year.

Coordination in ELAM - 2013-2014
 Walky Dariela Zúniga
 Magdalena Chiroy
 Kiria Mayen
 Maz Santos
 Germania Ramos
 Lilian Angelica Suy
 Margurie
 Adie Patrick Adie

Coordination in ELAM - 2012-2013
 Jose Norwing Manzanarez
 Emilio Melendez
 Magdalena Chiroy
 Andrea Rosales
 Christina Malima
 Jorge Ferreira da Silva
 Everly Haydee Abac
 Dineshkumar Anton Somarajah

Coordination in ELAM - 2012-2013
 Reina Reyes Reyes
 William Castro Lopez
 Luis Gerrardo
 Every Abac
 Christina Malima
 Cristine Marie Galope
 Kelvin
 Santos

Presence of non-Spanish speakers
From 2010, when the non=Spanish speakers started to come to ELAM in a big quantity, Espiritu Joven opened for them also, especially in the coordination. In 2012, Espritu Joven started its services in English, other than Spanish, for the English speakers in ELAM.

References

External links
 Official website

Catholic youth organizations
Christianity in Cuba
Youth organizations based in Cuba